John Edward Hill is an American family physician in Tupelo, Mississippi.

Early life and education
Born in Omaha, Nebraska, Hill was educated in the public schools of Vicksburg, Mississippi and received both his B.S. and M.D. degrees from the University of Mississippi.

Career
A board certified family physician, Hill began his professional career in the rural Mississippi Delta where he practiced for 27 years. In addition to his full-service family practice, Hill developed and directed a local maternal child health program that resulted in lowering the fetal mortality rate from one of the highest in the United States to below the national average, where it remained. Hill was asked in January 1995 to become the director of the Family Practice Residency Program at North Mississippi Medical Center, which is the nation's largest rural hospital.

AMA president
In a speech entitled "Understanding, Advocacy, Leadership: The AMA Perspective on LGBT Health," Hill became the first president of the AMA to address the Gay and Lesbian Medical Association.  

His speech is considered by some as an historic turning point in the policy of the AMA's towards LGBT physicians after the events at New York Medical College during the tenure of the previous AMA president Dr. John Nelson.

References

American primary care physicians
Sexual orientation and medicine
University of Mississippi alumni
Living people
Year of birth missing (living people)
Family physicians
Presidents of the American Medical Association